Garrison Dam is an earth-fill embankment dam on the Missouri River in central North Dakota, U.S.
The reservoir impounded by the dam is Lake Sakakawea, which extends to Williston and the confluence with the Yellowstone River, near the Montana border.

Location
Garrison Dam is located between Riverdale and Pick City, and named after the town of Garrison, directly north of the dam, across the reservoir.

History

The dam was part of a flood control and hydroelectric power generation project named the Pick-Sloan Project along the river, after the two plan developers, Col. Lewis A. Pick and William Glenn Sloan. Majority-white communities had resisted having the dam built at other locations on the river where they would be affected.

In order to construct the dam, the US government needed to purchase  of bottomlands in the Fort Berthold Reservation that would be flooded by the creation of Lake Sakakawea. These lands were owned by the Three Affiliated Tribes, and the territory "had been their home for perhaps more than a millennium".

Threatened by confiscation under eminent domain, the tribes protested. A complete block of Garrison Dam power was denied because it would violate the 1935 Rural Electrification Act. The tribes gained remuneration, but lost 94% of their agricultural land in 1947, when they were forced to accept $5,105,625. This amount was increased to $7.5 million in 1949, but it did not fully compensate them for the loss of their important farmlands, homes, towns, and graves. They had cultivated the bottomlands and were able to be largely self-sufficient.

The final settlement legislation denied the tribes' right to use the reservoir shoreline for traditional grazing, hunting, fishing or other purposes, including irrigation development and royalty rights on all subsurface minerals within the reservoir area. About 1,700 residents were forcibly relocated, some to New Town, North Dakota at the northern end of the reservation.

Thus construction of Garrison Dam almost totally destroyed the traditional way of life for the Three Affiliated Tribes and made them much more dependent on the federal government. In addition, the size the lake, and the lack of bridges to cross it for decades, disrupted traditional relations among the peoples. It created new divisions among the segments on the reservation Construction on the $300-million dam project began in 1947, and its embankment was enclosed in April 1953. The dam was dedicated by President Eisenhower two months later. The Corps of Engineers completed earthwork in the fall of 1954.

Garrison Dam is one of six Missouri River Main stem dams operated by the U.S. Army Corps of Engineers, Omaha District. The dam upstream of Garrison Dam is Fort Peck Dam (near Fort Peck, Montana). The dams downstream of Garrison Dam are: Oahe Dam (near Pierre, South Dakota), Big Bend Dam (near Fort Thompson, South Dakota), Fort Randall Dam (near Pickstown, South Dakota), and Gavins Point Dam (near Yankton, South Dakota).

The first use of the emergency spillway due to flooding started on June 1, 2011, at 8:00am.

Energy generation
Hydropower turbines at Garrison Dam have an electric power generating nameplate capacity of 583.3 MW. Average production of 257 MW serves several hundred thousand customers.

Fishing
The Garrison Dam National Fish Hatchery is the world's largest walleye and northern pike producing facility and also works to restore endangered species, such as the pallid sturgeon.

See also 
Lake Sakakawea
U.S. Army Corps of Engineers
Riverdale, North Dakota
Lake Audubon
List of dams and reservoirs in North Dakota

References

External links

U.S. Army Corps of Engineers - Garrison Project
North Dakota State Historical Societyl - Finding Aid - The Garrison Dam and Lake Sakakawea
U.S. Fish and Wildlife Service  - Garrison Dam National Fish Hatchery
Historic American Engineering Record documentation, all filed under Riverdale, McLean County, ND:

Dams in North Dakota
Buildings and structures in McLean County, North Dakota
Buildings and structures in Mercer County, North Dakota
Dams on the Missouri River
Earth-filled dams
Historic American Engineering Record in North Dakota
United States Army Corps of Engineers dams
Dams completed in 1953
Forcibly depopulated communities in the United States
Mandan, Hidatsa, and Arikara Nation